A clod is a lump of dirt.

Clod  may also refer to:


People
 Bente Clod (born 1946), Danish poet and writer
 Frederick Clod (1625–after 1661), English alchemist and physician

Acronym
 National Legion of Decency, also known as the Catholic Legion of Decency
 Continuous level of detail, a computer graphics technique to adapt the detail of the displayed 3D object to the user needs

Other uses
 Beef clod or Chuck clod, two cuts of beef
 Antonov An-14, NATO reporting name "Clod", a Soviet transport aircraft
 Clods, literal name of the Regavim kibbutz in Israel
 The Clod, a 1913 Western film
 Clod, a character in Nella the Princess Knight, an animated children's television series

See also
 Clod Ensemble, UK company
 "The Clod and the Pebble", a poem by William Blake
 
 

 Claude (disambiguation)
 Cloud (disambiguation)